The Star Awards for Best Variety Show Host was an award presented annually at the Star Awards, a ceremony that was established in 1994.

The category was introduced in 1998, at the 5th Star Awards ceremony; Kym Ng received the award for her performance in City Beat and it is given in honour of a Mediacorp host who has delivered an outstanding performance in a variety show. The nominees were determined by a team of judges employed by Mediacorp; winners are selected by a majority vote from the entire judging panel.

Since its inception, the award was given to seven hosts. Pornsak is the most recent and final winner in this category for his performance in The Joy Truck II. Sharon Au, Mark Lee, and Kym Ng are the only hosts to win in this category four times, surpassing Quan Yi Fong who has two wins. In addition, Lee and Ng were nominated on nine occasions, more than any other host. Dasmond Koh, Lee Teng, and Jeff Wang hold the record for the most nominations without a win, with four.

The award was discontinued from 2016 as all performances in the hosting category (variety, info-ed) were shifted to the newly formed Best Programme Host category.

Recipients

 Each year is linked to the article about the Star Awards held that year.

Category facts

Most wins

Most nominations

References

External links 

Star Awards